Old Greenville City Hall is a former building in Greenville, South Carolina, originally built as the U.S. Courthouse and Post Office in 1889 on the corner of Main and Broad Streets. Transferred to the city of Greenville in 1938, it served as Greenville city hall. It was listed in the National Register of Historic Places on August 19, 1971, and was removed in 1973 after its demolition.

History

The courthouse and post office was designed by James H. Windrim, who was Supervisory Architect for the United States Department of the Treasury. and built on the site of the home of Colonel David Hoke. The resident architect for the construction was James R. Lawrence, who moved from Port Huron, Michigan, to complete the project.
 
In 1909, James Knox Taylor was the Supervisory Architect for an addition to its north side. More alterations or minor additions were made in 1923, 1924, 1927, 1929, and 1931.

The U.S. Circuit Court for the Western District of South Carolina met here until 1898. The U.S. District Court for the Western District of South Carolina met here until 1937.

The city of Greenville traded the federal government a parcel of land on East Washington Street for the courthouse. After construction of a new post office on that parcel, the building became Greenville City Hall in 1938.

A new city hall was built on an adjoining lot formerly occupied by a Masonic Temple, the Old City Hall was demolished in 1973, and a parking garage was built on its site across Broad Street from the Peace Center.

Architecture

The two-story building was designed in Richardsonian Romanesque style with a red tiled roof, castellated towers, and precast terracotta insets. The foyer had pink marble floors and the staircase that led to the tower was designed with half-turns on its landings. The building has been compared to the Smithsonian Castle.

References

See also

List of United States federal courthouses in South Carolina

City and town halls on the National Register of Historic Places in South Carolina
Government buildings completed in 1889
Buildings and structures in Greenville, South Carolina
Demolished buildings and structures in South Carolina
City and town halls in South Carolina
Former federal courthouses in the United States
Courthouses in South Carolina
Post office buildings in South Carolina
Richardsonian Romanesque architecture in South Carolina
National Register of Historic Places in Greenville, South Carolina
Former National Register of Historic Places in South Carolina
Buildings and structures demolished in 1973